The Coptic Orthodox Church of Alexandria has several churches in Great Britain and Ireland under the jurisdiction of four diocesan bishops.

The first liturgical service prayed in the British Isles took place in London on 10 August 1954, officiated by delegates attending the general assembly of the World Council of Churches. The foundation of the church and its establishment of a parish started with a liturgical service held in London in February 1969, prayed by the Bishop of Christian Education, Shenouda (later Pope Shenouda III of Alexandria, the 117th pope of the church). Regular services only began in 1971 when the first resident Coptic priest, Father Antuniyus al-Suryani (later Metropolitan Pakhomious of Beheira), celebrated the Divine Liturgy at Saint Andrew's Church, Holborn, London. In 1976, the church council purchased a building in Kensington, establishing the Coptic Orthodox parish of St Mark; this was served by three monastic priests, who later on became members of the Holy Synod of the mother church in Egypt. Pope Shenouda III consecrated St. Mark's Coptic Orthodox Church in Kensington, London in 1979.

By 1981, other communities had been established around Britain and Ireland, with regular services at which visiting priests officiated, including Fr Bishoy Boshra and Fr Antonious Thabet. In April 1985, St Mary & St Antony's Coptic Orthodox Church in Birmingham was consecrated by the first resident bishop sent to Britain, Bishop Missael, making it the second church to be established in England and the first outside London.

Following the establishment of St Mary & S. Mark's Coptic Orthodox Centre in Birmingham, Bishop Missael was consecrated on 26 May 1991 by Pope Shenouda III as the first bishop of the first Coptic Orthodox diocese in the British Isles, the Diocese of Birmingham, which became the Diocese of the Midlands. In 1995, Bishop Antony was consecrated with the formation of the Diocese of Ireland, Scotland, North East England and its Affiliated Regions. Fr Angaelos Anba Bishoy (now Bishop Angaelos) of Archangel Michael & St Anthony Coptic Centre in Stevenage was consecrated in 1999 as a general bishop and patriarchal exarch for youth ministry at the Patriarchal Centre and the Coptic Orthodox Theological College.

The Coptic Orthodox Church and congregation has continued to grow and expand in various parts of Britain and Ireland.

Historical background
It is known in the ecclesiastical history of the Church of Alexandria that the church had sent missionaries in the 3rd or 4th century to the Celtic lands, especially monks.

It is also known within the Celtic tradition, especially in Ireland, that the foundation of the monastic system among the Celts was either based in portion on or inspired by the Egyptian monastic system, and there are many traces of Alexandrine theology embedded in Celtic theology.

Coptic Orthodox Diocese of Ireland, Scotland, North East England and its Affiliated Regions
Bishop Antony, bishop of the Diocese of Ireland, Scotland and North East England. The diocese was established in 1995.

Churches 

Ireland
Belfast – St Steven Church
Cahir – St Mina Church
Cahir – Coptic Culture Centre
Delvin – St George Abbey
Dublin - St Mary & St Demiana Church 
Dublin – St. Maximus and Domatius Church
Galway – Seven Coptic Monks Church
Waterford – St Athanasius Monastery

Scotland
-Kirkcaldy – St Mark Church
Glasgow – St Mary and St Michael Church

North East England
Newcastle – St George & St Athanasius Church
Leeds – St. Mary & St. Abanoub Church
Rotherham – St. Antonius Church
Scarborough – St. Athanasius Monastery

Affiliated regions
Bromley – St. John the Evangelist's Church
Margate (Kent) – St. Michael & St. Bishoy Church
Guilford – St Augustine Church
Norwich – St. Athanasius Church
Bournemouth – St. Peter & St. Paul Church
Plymouth – St. Mary and St. George Church
Bristol – St. Marina church

Communities
Hull – St. Joseph
York – Contemporary Coptic Martyrs
Ipswich – St. Mary & St. Sishoy
Hastings – St. Mary & St. Theodore
Belfast – St. Steven
Kilkenny – St. Philopater
Tralee – St. Joseph
Cork – St. Pope Kyrillos VI

Websites
Official Website of the Coptic Orthodox Diocese of Ireland, Scotland, North East England and its Affiliated Regions, U.K.

Coptic Orthodox Diocese of the Midlands

Bishop Missael is the bishop of the Holy Diocese of the Midlands.
The Diocese was established in 1991 by Pope Shenouda III, making it the oldest diocese in the United Kingdom for the Coptic Orthodox Patriarchate. The Diocese is currently based at the Coptic Orthodox Centre in Lapworth, Warwickshire, where Bishop Missael resides. Its territories include North Wales and the English regions: West Midlands, East Midlands, North West and parts of the South East, South West and East of England.

Churches 
Birmingham
St. Mary & St. Mark's Coptic Orthodox Centre (includes St. Mary & St. Abu-Sefein's Church)
St. Mary & Archangel Michael's Coptic Orthodox Cathedral
St. Mary and St. Antony's Coptic Orthodox Church

Bolton
St. Mary & St. Philopater's Coptic Orthodox Church

Liverpool
St. Mary & St. Cyril's Coptic Orthodox Church

Manchester
St. Mary & St. Mina's Coptic Orthodox Church

Nottingham
St. Mary & St. George's Coptic Orthodox Church

North Wales (Llandudno)
St. Mary & St. Abaskhyron's Coptic Orthodox Church

Communities
Central Birmingham
Derby
Leicester
Northampton
Oxford
Stoke-on-Trent
Worcester

Websites
Official Website of the Coptic Orthodox Diocese of the Midlands, U.K.
Coptic Orthodox Churches in Birmingham
St. Mary & St. Mina's Coptic Orthodox Church of Manchester
St. Mary & St. George's Coptic Orthodox Church of Nottingham
St. Mary & St. Abaskhyron's Coptic Orthodox Church of Llandudno, North Wales
St. Mary & St. Cyril's Coptic Orthodox Church of Liverpool
St. Mary & St. Philopater's Coptic Orthodox Church of Bolton
Coptic Olympics – A Diocese Family & Youth Ministry
The Global St. Mark Festival Competition Within the Diocese
DeaconTube – Online Learning and Teaching of Coptic Hymns
Go2Galilee – Diocese Events Ministry
Daily Readings of the Coptic Orthodox Church

Coptic Orthodox Diocese of London

Bishop Angaelos OBE, Bishop of the Holy Diocese of London and Patriarchal Exarch. The diocese was established in 2017 by Pope Tawadros II of Alexandria and is currently based at St George's Coptic Orthodox Cathedral in Stevenage, the seat of the bishop.

Churches 
Stevenage
St. George's Coptic Orthodox Cathedral at the Archangel Michael & St. Anthony Centre, Stevenage (Fr Shenouda)

London
St Mark's Coptic Orthodox Church, London (Fr Antonious Thabet, Fr Thomas Ghobrial)
St Mary and Archangel Michael's Coptic Orthodox Church, Golden Green (Fr Looka Kamel, Fr Mina Barsoum)
St Mary and St Shenouda's Coptic Orthodox Church, Coulsdon (Fr Isak Henien, Fr Kyrillos Asad)
St Mary and Pope Kyrillos VI's Coptic Orthodox Church, Hounslow, London (Fr Morkos Fakhry)
S. Mary and St George's Coptic Orthodox Church, East London (Fr Michael Lambros)

South Wales
St Mary's and St Abu Saifain's Coptic Orthodox Church, Cardiff, Wales. Although the Coptic Orthodox congregation has been present in Wales since the 1960s, the Church in Wales was only consecrated in 1992 by Pope Shenouda III of Alexandria.

Communities
St. Mary and St. Mina, New Malden

Websites
Official Website of the Diocese of London
Official Website of Bishop Angaelos
Diocese of London Ministries
Diocese of London Youth Mission
Coptic Orthodox Church Centre in Stevenage, U.K.
St. Mark's Coptic Orthodox Churches in London
St. Mary & St. Shenouda's Coptic Orthodox Church in Croydon
St. Mary & St. Archangel Michael's Coptic Orthodox Church in Golders Green
St. Mary & St. Pope Kyrillos's Coptic Orthodox Church in Hounslow
St. Mary & St. Mercurius' Coptic Orthodox Church in Cardiff
Coptic Orthodox Dioceses in the United Kingdom

Sussex
These churches are currently under the supervision of Bishop Paula, diocesan bishop of Tanta, since he is currently the head of the parish's council.
St Mary and St Abraam Coptic Orthodox Church, Hove  
St Demiana and St. Pope Kyrillos VI Coptic Orthodox Church, Worthing

South West Wales

Archangel Michael and St. Mina Coptic Orthodox Church, Swansea. This Church is under patriarchal supervision of Pope Tawadros II of Alexandria since he is currently the head of the Parish's Council.

See also
Coptic Orthodox Church in Europe
Copts – ethnoreligious group
Oriental Orthodoxy
Coptic Orthodox Church in Wales
Saint Mary & Saint Philopateer Abu Saifain Coptic Orthodox Church, Risca, South Wales
St Mary and St Abraam Coptic Orthodox Church, Hove, East Sussex, England
Bishop Missael
Anba Angaelos
British Orthodox Church
Coptic diaspora

References

External links
St Mark Coptic Orthodox Church, London website
Coptic Orthodox Diocese of Midlands, U.K.
Coptic Orthodox Centre Stevenage
St. Mary and St. Shenouda Coptic Orthodox Church
St John Coptic Orthodox Church, Bromley .
St Peter and St Paul's Coptic Orthodox Church, Bournemouth website
St. Mary and St. Abanoub Coptic Orthodox Church, North and West Yorkshire

Coptic Orthodox Church in the United Kingdom
Eastern Christianity in the Republic of Ireland